The Bezdna (Biznä) is a river in Tatarstan, Russian Federation, a left-bank tributary of the Volga, flowing into the Kuybyshev Reservoir near Kuralovo, Spassky District.

The town of Spassk, the ancestor of modern Bolgar stood on the river prior to 1956. In 1956–57 the Kuybyshev reservoir was created, flooding the town and the lower stream of Bezdna.

References 

Rivers of Tatarstan